Luis Fernando Sandoval Oyola (born 1 June 1999) is a Colombian footballer who currently plays as a forward for Atlético Junior. He played in the 2019 FIFA U-20 World Cup with Colombia U20.

Career statistics

Club

Notes

References

1999 births
Living people
Colombian footballers
Association football forwards
Atlético Junior footballers
Barranquilla F.C. footballers
Categoría Primera A players
Categoría Primera B players
People from Atlántico Department
Colombia under-20 international footballers